The Wantagh Herald is an American weekly newspaper that serves Garden City, Wantagh, and Seaford in Nassau County, New York. It is published on Thursdays with a circulation of 3,081 as of 2018. The editor is Michael Hinman, with Michael Malaszczyk serving as its reporter.

It is considered a paper of public record by Nassau County clerk's office.

History 
The Wantagh Herald Citizen was founded as the Southeaster in 1949 and became the Wantagh Seaford Citizen in 1953. The paper was split in two and changed in 2014 to the Wantagh Herald Citizenand Seaford Herald Citizen. In 2021, they both became the Wantagh Herald and Seaford Herald.

G.L. Bricker, an early editor of the Southeaster paper in Wantagh, was sued for a million dollars for libel by the New York Communist Party.

In 1958, Faith and Johannes Laursen purchased the paper, along with Merrick Life, Bellmore Life, and the Freeport-Baldwin Leader. Johannes Laursen was briefly the head of the New York Press Association. The four papers together comprised L&M Publications, which was later run by the Laursen's children, Linda Toscano and Paul Laursen.

L&M Publications was acquired in 2013 by Richner Communications, and the Wantagh Seaford Citizen was added to Richner's newspaper group, Herald Community Newspapers. It was split into two newspapers; the Wantagh Herald Citizen and Seaford Herald Citizen. In 2021, both papers dropped the Citizen from their title, and are now the Wantagh Herald and Seaford Herald.

Awards
Herald Community Papers received 2nd place in the New York Press Association's 2017 Better Newspapers Contest, in the category of Group or Chain Newspapers. The Wantagh Herald Citizen also received 2nd place in that 2017 contest for Best Small Space Ad.

References

External links 
 Official website

Newspapers published in New York (state)
Nassau County, New York
1949 establishments in New York (state)
Newspapers established in 1949